The Death of William Posters is a 1965 novel by the British writer Alan Sillitoe. It is the first in a trilogy featuring the Nottingham factory worker Frank Dawley, followed by A Tree on Fire (1967) and The Flame of Life (1974).

References

Bibliography
 Gillian Mary Hanson. Understanding Alan Sillitoe. University of South Carolina Press, 1999

1965 British novels
Novels by Alan Sillitoe
Novels set in England
W. H. Allen & Co. books